Arctic Flight is a 1952 drama film directed by Lew Landers and starring Wayne Morris, Alan Hale Jr. and Lola Albright. It was produced by Monogram Pictures. Arctic Flight depicts bush pilot flying in the Arctic on the edge of the International Date Line, involving Soviet intrigue.

Plot
In Kotzebue, Alaska, bush pilot Mike Wein (Wayne Morris) receives a government contract to fly schoolteacher and nurse Martha Raymond (Lola Albright) to Little Diomede Island, an island two miles from the Soviet-owned Big Diomede Island. Worried that the trigger-happy guards may shoot at them, Mike lands his aircraft short of the Inuit village of Little Diomede, and transports Martha by dog sled, over the short distance remaining on the frozen Bering Strait. A romance between the two is kindled.

When Martha arrives, she is welcomed by local Catholic priest Father François (Kenneth MacDonald) and local resident Miksook (Anthony Garson). She is replacing the teacher who had wandered too close to the International Date Line that separates the two islands and was shot and killed. Flying to Nome, Mike learns he has another job, flying businessman John W. Wetherby (Alan Hale Jr.) on a polar bear hunt. Bad weather delays the hunt and Wetherby expresses an interest in visiting Little Diomede. A native girl Saranna (Carol Thurston) tells Mike that his friend Dave Karluck (Thomas Richards Sr.), has been mauled in a bear attack. Mike and Wetherby find the polar bear and Wetherby kills the animal, and proceeds to skin him. About to leave, Wetherby's wallet drops out and Mike sees that a pass to go to Soviet territory is inside the wallet. Knicked by a skinning knife wielded by Wetherby, the wounded pilot is flown back by the businessman to Little Diomede where Martha treats the wound.

Mike confides in Martha that his client did not stab him by accident, and is not who he is claiming. Martha is afraid that Mike is delirious but finding Wetherby's identification card, leads to a confrontation where Mike, coming to her rescue, is knocked out. In his haste to head out over the ice to the Soviet base on Big Diomede, Wetherby loses a packet of papers, including microfilms of defense installations in the United States and his identification card. When he tries to enter the base without an entry card, he is shot and killed by the sentries. Martha and Mike realize that Wetherby was a spy and their efforts have stopped his plan to deliver military secrets to an enemy power.

Cast
 Wayne Morris as Mike Wein
 Alan Hale Jr. as John W. Wetherby  
 Lola Albright as Martha Raymond 
 Carol Thurston as Saranna Koonuk 
 Phil Tead as "Squid" Tucker
 Thomas Richards Sr. as Dave Karluck (credited as Tom Richards)
 Anthony Garson as  Miksook 
 Kenneth MacDonald as Father François 
 Paul Bryar as "Happy" Hogan
 Dale Van Sickel as Joe Dorgan

Production
 
Principal photography for Arctic Flight took place from late February to early April 1952 at Little Diomede Island in Alaska and at KTTV Studios in Los Angeles. Writer Ewing Scott directed most of the Alaskan footage, but was replaced by Lew Landers after a flare-up of an old leg injury. A Cessna 170B (N1470D) appeared as the bush plane the lead character flew.

Reception
Arctic Flight, was primarily a B film. Aviation Film Historian Stephen Pendo characterized the Monogram films as unpretentious but with Lew Landers directing, the experienced specialist in low-cost filmmaking, there was always a good product turned out. Noted Hollywood cinematographer Richard H. Kline considered Landers "... the most prolific of all directors", adept in many genres.

References

Notes

Citations

Bibliography

 Pendo, Stephen. Aviation in the Cinema. Lanham, Maryland: Scarecrow Press, 1985. .
 Weaver, Tom. A Sci-Fi Swarm and Horror Horde: Interviews with 62 Filmmakers. Jefferson, North Carolina: McFarland & Company, 2010. .

External links
 
 

1952 films
1950s spy drama films
Monogram Pictures films
American aviation films
1950s English-language films
American spy drama films
American black-and-white films
Cold War spy films
Films set in Alaska
Films set on islands
Films shot in Alaska
Films shot in Los Angeles
Films directed by Lew Landers
1952 drama films
1950s American films